The North Carolina–Wake Forest rivalry is a series of athletic contests between the University of North Carolina Tar Heels and the Wake Forest University Demon Deacons. The first football game between the two institutions was played in 1888.  As a consequence of ACC expansion in the 21st century, the two schools do not play each other annually in football, as they were placed in separate divisions and assigned different opponents for their "protected" (i.e., annual) cross-division games.

Football

History
The University of North Carolina and Wake Forest University have a long shared athletic history, having formerly been located in close proximity to one another, as Wake Forest was originally located in Wake Forest, North Carolina.  In 1956, the university moved its campus across the state of North Carolina to its current location in Winston-Salem, North Carolina.   

The football rivalry, first meeting in 1888, is the oldest intercollegiate football rivalry in the American state of North Carolina As of 2021, there have been 109 games between the two teams. The 2019 & 2021 games are non-conference games and thus were not be counted in the ACC standings.
This unusual occurrence of a non-conference regular season game between teams in the same conference has only occurred once before in the recent history of the major FBS conferences.

Results

Notable Games

2001
The Tar Heels built a 24–0 first-half lead behind a phenomenal performance by freshman quarterback Darian Durant, who threw for a freshmen school record 361 yards. Carolina looked in control taking a 31–14 lead into the fourth quarter after Durant threw his fourth touchdown pass of the game. Then things began to unravel for the Tar Heels. After the Deacons cut the lead to 7, the Tar Heels snapped the ball out of the back of the end zone for a safety, cutting the lead to 31–26 with 4:49 left in the game. Wake Forest put together a 59-yard drive, capped by a 1-yard touchdown run by quarterback James MacPherson with just over a minute remaining. The Tar Heels’ final chance fell short as Wake safety Quinton Williams forced a Darian Durant fumble with 45 seconds remaining, and the Deacons won 32–31. The 24-point comeback was one of the largest in ACC history.

2021
Wake Forest entered the game 8–0 for the first time in program history and ranked #9 in the College Football Playoff rankings and #10 in the AP Poll, both rankings being the highest in program history. The game featured an explosion of offense as the teams combined for 1,161 total yards. With 7:38 remaining in the third quarter, Wake Forest quarterback Sam Hartman connected with receiver A.T. Perry on a 66 yard touchdown pass, which gave the Demon Deacons a 45–27 lead. Over the next 21 minutes of the game, North Carolina went on a 31–3 run which included three rushing touchdowns by running back Ty Chandler, who finished the game with career highs of 213 yards and four touchdowns. After Carolina cut the lead to seven with 10:40 left in the game, Tar Heel safety Cam'Ron Kelly intercepted Hartman for the second time of the game. The Tar Heels quickly scored, tying the game at 48–48. The Tar Heel defense forced two consecutive turnovers on downs as Carolina erased a 14-point fourth quarter deficit, ultimately winning the game 58–55. With the win, the Tar Heels notched their first home win against a top-ten opponent since defeating #3 Miami in 2004.

See also 
 List of NCAA college football rivalry games
 List of most-played college football series in NCAA Division I

Men's basketball 

Carolina currently leads the series 163–70.

The rivalry dates back to when Wake Forest was in Wake Forest, NC, and was only a short distance from UNC's campus. The rivalry that grew between the two schools became very intense, with fights breaking out on the court in certain match ups. Their rivalry eventually expanded into the Big Four with NC State and Duke, which are recognized as being some of the fiercest rivalries in NCAA men's basketball.

Over the years there have been many classic and exciting games in this series. In 1983, UNC came back from behind to win 80–78 at the Greensboro Coliseum. 
In 1995, the two teams faced each other in the ACC Tournament Championship game. Wake won behind center Tim Duncan and shooting guard Randolph Childress who made the go-ahead basket in an 82–80 overtime win.

References

1888 establishments in North Carolina
Wake
Wake Forest Demon Deacons football
Wake
College sports in North Carolina